Marudhuri Raja is a Telugu film writer, and director. He worked as a dialogue writer for more than 200 films. He worked with noted Telugu film directors like E. V. V. Satyanarayana, S. V. Krishna Reddy, K. Raghavendra Rao. His elder brother M. V. S. Haranatha Rao is a film and stage writer. He also directed some films.

Personal life
Raja was born in Guntur and studied in Ongole. One of five siblings, his elder brother, M. V. S. Haranatha Rao, was a noted film and stage writer and artist. Their father was a clerk and their mother was a musician. Raja wrote, directed and acted in stage plays since child hood. Before entering into the film industry he wrote 18 stage plays.

Career
Raja made his debut as a dialogue writer with the film Navabharatam. He got many opportunities later with noted directors including E. V. V. Satyanarayana, S. V. Krishna Reddy, and K. Raghavendra Rao.

Filmography

Ontari Poratam
Alibaba Aradajanu Dongalu
Subhakankshalu
Sisindri
Egire Pavurama
Aavida Maa Aavide
Girl Friend
Yagnam
Kathi Kantha Rao
Denikaina Ready
Seema Tapakai
Athanokkade
Oka Pellam Muddu Rendo Pellam Vaddu
Gudu Gudu Gunjam
Ontari
Kanchanamala Cable TV
Sravanamasam
Khatarnak
Pellam Oorelithe
Agni
Seema Sastri
Kathanayakudu
Game
Vastadu Naa Raju
Hanuman Junction
Nuvvu Vastavani
Juniors (2003)
Ranam
Suryavamsam
Veerabhadra
Sankharavam
Nuvva Nena
Eduruleni Manishi
Antha Mana Manchike

References

External links 
 

Living people
Telugu film directors
People from Guntur
Film directors from Andhra Pradesh
Telugu screenwriters
Indian male screenwriters
20th-century Indian dramatists and playwrights
20th-century Indian film directors
Screenwriters from Andhra Pradesh
20th-century Indian male writers
Year of birth missing (living people)